Henry Robinson Hall (1859–1927) was a Victorian and Edwardian landscape painter in oils and watercolours noted for his Highland cattle.

Life

Hall was born to Eliza Robinson in the City of York in 1859 and died on 31 May 1927 at Barrow-in-Furness. He lived in the City of York, Elswick, Blackpool, Woodland, Coniston and Barrow-in-Furness, and married Mary Annie née Bleasdale. He is buried in the yard of St. Andrews parish church at Coniston.

Hall was a painter who exhibited at the Royal Academy in 1902  and was a fellow of the North British Academy of Arts.

Hall's known works include:

 A Cattle Raid in the Highlands (1890).
 Coniston Lake from Lake Bank (nd).
 Denizen of the Highlands (nd).
 Drover with Cows by Lake Buttermere Evening (nd).
 Evening Glow (1902) 
 Highland Cattle (nd).
 Highland Cattle above Loch Maree (nd).
 Highland Cattle Loch Lomond (nd). 
 Highland Cattle, Isle of Skye (nd).
 River Wyre Nr Poulton-le-Fylde (1897). 
 The Dying Stag (1896). 
 The Ghyll, Coniston, Cumbria  (nd).
 The Home of the Golden Eagle (nd).
 The Young Falconer (nd).

References

19th-century English painters
English male painters
20th-century English painters
Artists from York
People from Barrow-in-Furness
1859 births
1927 deaths
20th-century English male artists
19th-century English male artists